Chirbury was a rural district in Shropshire, England from 1894 to 1974.

It was created by the Local Government Act 1894 based on that part of the Montgomery rural sanitary district which was in Shropshire (and England), the Welsh part forming Forden Rural District in Montgomeryshire).  It consisted of the three parishes of Brompton and Rhiston, Chirbury and Worthen.

It was abolished in 1934 under a County Review Order and merged into the Clun Rural District.

Since 1974 it has formed part of the South Shropshire district.

References

History of Shropshire
Districts of England created by the Local Government Act 1894
Rural districts of England
Local government in Shropshire